The Science and Technology Facilities Council (STFC) is a United Kingdom government agency that carries out research in science and engineering, and funds UK research in areas including particle physics, nuclear physics, space science and astronomy (both ground-based and space-based).

History
STFC was formed in April 2007 when the Particle Physics and Astronomy Research Council (PPARC), the Council for the Central Laboratory of the Research Councils (CCLRC), along with the nuclear physics activities of the Engineering and Physical Sciences Research Council (EPSRC) were brought under the one umbrella organisation. The organisation's first Chief Executive was Professor Keith Mason, who held the position until 2011, when he was replaced by Professor John Womersley. Womersley servied as CEO until 2016 when he left to become Director General of the European Spallation Source. Dr Brian Bowsher, former CEO of the National Physical Laboratory and member of STFC's Council was the last CEO of the STFC before it was subsumed into UK Research and Innovation, a division of the Department for Business, Energy and Industrial Strategy. In 2018 Professor Mark Thomson was appointed as the first Executive Chair of STFC under UKRI.

Purpose 
Receiving its funding through the science budget from the Department for Business, Energy and Industrial Strategy (BEIS), STFC's mission is "To maximise the impact of our knowledge, skills, facilities
and resources for the benefit of the United Kingdom and its people" under several heads:
 Universities: the STFC supports university-based research, innovation and skills development in particle physics, nuclear physics, space science and astronomy.
 Scientific Facilities: They provide access to world-leading, large-scale facilities across a range of physical and life sciences, enabling research, innovation and skills.
 National Campuses: Working with partners to build National Science and Innovation Campuses based around National Laboratories to promote academic and industrial collaboration and translation of research to market through direct interaction with industry.
 Inspiring and Involving: STFC help create a future pipeline of skilled and enthusiastic young people by using the excitement of our sciences to encourage wider take-up of STEM subjects in school and future life (science, technology, engineering and mathematics).

Activities
The STFC is one of Europe's largest multidisciplinary research organisations supporting scientists and engineers worldwide. Through research fellowships and grants, it is responsible for funding research in UK universities, in the fields of astronomy, particle physics, nuclear physics and space science. The STFC operates its own world-class, large-scale research facilities (such as materials research, laser and space science and alternative energy exploration) and provides strategic advice to the UK government on their development. It manages international research projects in support of a broad cross-section of the UK research community and directs, coordinates and funds research, education and training. It is a partner in the UK Space Agency (formerly British National Space Centre or BNSC) providing about 40% of the UK government's expenditure in space science and technology.

Facilities 
It helps operate/provide access for UK and international scientists to the following large-scale facilities:
 Central Laser Facility (CLF) at the Rutherford Appleton Laboratory
 CERN
 DiRAC Distributed Research using Advanced Computing (Supercomputing facility)
 The space science and space exploration programmes of ESA
 European Synchrotron Radiation Facility (ESRF)
 Institut Laue-Langevin (ILL)
 Isaac Newton Group of Telescopes (ING), La Palma
 ISIS pulsed neutron and muon source at the Rutherford Appleton Laboratory
 Diamond Light Source, operating on STFC's Rutherford Appleton Laboratory site 
(Diamond is also partly funded by the Wellcome Trust.)
 UK Astronomy Technology Centre, Edinburgh
 Microelectronics Support Centre (MSC) at the Rutherford Appleton Laboratory
 The Hartree Centre for high performance computing and data analytics at Daresbury Laboratory
 ALICE (accelerator), EMMA (accelerator), CLARA and VELA at Daresbury Laboratory
 The LHC Computing Grid (through its funding of the GridPP project)
 Boulby underground laboratories
 Advanced LIGO

Budget 
STFC's budget is allocated annually by the Department for Business, Energy and Industrial Strategy. For 2015-16, its allocation was £529 million.

Knowledge exchange obligations 
STFC is active in its responsibility for knowledge exchange from government funded civil science into UKPLC. As such, many technologies are licensed to UK companies and spin-out companies created including:

 L3 Technology (L3T);
 Microvisk;
 Orbital Optics Ltd;
 Oxsensis;
 PETRRA;
 Quantum Detectors;
 ThruVision.

However knowledge exchange activities are not purely limited to commercialization of technologies, but also cover a wider range of activities which aim to transfer expertise into the wider economy.

See also 
 Cosener's House, a conference centre owned by STFC in Abingdon
 National Astronomy Week (NAW)

References 

 
Science and technology in the United Kingdom
Research councils
Organisations based in Swindon
Government agencies established in 2007
Space programme of the United Kingdom
Department for Business, Energy and Industrial Strategy
Non-departmental public bodies of the United Kingdom government
2007 establishments in the United Kingdom
Members of the European Research Consortium for Informatics and Mathematics